MWR may refer to:

 Men Wyman Raised, when the Men Wyman Raised must go to the GROG, Wyman must come too, and not be a snob
 Michael Waltrip Racing, a NASCAR racing team
 Monthly Weather Review, an American Meteorological Society journal
 Morale, Welfare and Recreation, an American military support network
 Museum of World Religions, a museum in New Taipei, Taiwan
 Microwave Radiometer (MWR), an instrument on the Juno Jupiter orbiter

See also
 Call of Duty: Modern Warfare Reflex
 Call of Duty: Modern Warfare Remastered